{{Taxobox
|regnum=Animalia|phylum=Arthropoda|classis=Insecta|ordo=Hemiptera|subordo=Auchenorrhyncha
|familia=Cicadellidae
|subfamilia=Deltocephalinae
|tribus=Deltocephalini|genus=Maiestas formerly Recilia|species=M. mica|binomial=Maiestas mica|binomial_authority=(Kramer, 1962)|synonyms = Recilia mica Kramer, 1962}}Maiestas mica is a species of leafhopper from the Cicadellidae family that can be found in Republic of the Congo, Liberia, and the Ivory Coast. It was formerly placed within Recilia, but a 2009 revision moved it to Maiestas''.

References

Insects described in 1962
Insects of Africa
Maiestas